Los Pérez García is a 1950 Argentine film.

Starring / Intérpretes:
Martín Zabalúa, Sara Prósperi, Juan Carlos Altavista, Julián Bourges. Gustavo Cavero, Manolita Poli, Pedro Prevosti, Beatriz Taibo, Paula Darlán, Celia Geraldy, Carlos Ginés, Mario Clavel Orquesta Francini Portier  Arturo Arcari

External links
 

Equipo Técnico
Producción:

1950 films
1950s Spanish-language films
Argentine black-and-white films
Argentine comedy films
1950 comedy films
1950s Argentine films